Maria-Grazzia Lacedelli (née Constantini; born 15 January 1943 in Cortina d'Ampezzo) is an Italian curler.

At the international level, she is a  silver medallist. During 1970s-1980s she was the long-time skip of Italian national women's team, competed on 6 World and 12 European championships.

Teams

References

External links

Living people
1943 births
People from Cortina d'Ampezzo
Italian female curlers
Sportspeople from the Province of Belluno